The men's Greco-Roman heavyweight competition at the 1964 Summer Olympics in Tokyo took place from 16 to 19 October at the Komazawa Gymnasium. Nations were limited to one competitor.

Competition format

This Greco-Roman wrestling competition continued to use the "bad points" elimination system introduced at the 1928 Summer Olympics for Greco-Roman and at the 1932 Summer Olympics for freestyle wrestling, as adjusted at the 1960 Summer Olympics. Each bout awarded 4 points. If the victory was by fall, the winner received 0 and the loser 4. If the victory was by decision, the winner received 1 and the loser 3. If the bout was tied, each wrestler received 2 points. A wrestler who accumulated 6 or more points was eliminated. Rounds continued until there were 3 or fewer uneliminated wrestlers. If only 1 wrestler remained, he received the gold medal. If 2 wrestlers remained, point totals were ignored and they faced each other for gold and silver (if they had already wrestled each other, that result was used). If 3 wrestlers remained, point totals were ignored and a round-robin was held among those 3 to determine medals (with previous head-to-head results, if any, counting for this round-robin).

Results

Round 1

 Bouts

 Points

Round 2

Kaplan and Kangasniemi were eliminated after losses in each of the first two rounds. Kozma had two wins by fall and stayed at 0 points to lead the group.

 Bouts

 Points

Round 3

Kozma had a bye and stayed at 0 points. Dietrich and Roshchin each won by fall and stayed near Kozma at 1 point apiece, insulating the three men from possible elimination for another round. Svensson picked up a 3rd point and Dietrich stayed at 4. All four bout losers in this round were eliminated.

 Bouts

 Points

Round 4

With Kment on a bye and Kozma, Dietrich, and Roshchin each at 1 point or fewer, Svensson was the only wrestler who could potentially be eliminated in this round. He needed a win or tie to stay in competition, but lost to Roshchin to be eliminated. Kozma got his first point, Roshchin his second, and Dietrich received 3 points to move to 4 total

 Bouts

 Points

Round 5

Kozma eliminated Kment and Roshchin eliminated Dietrich, setting up a gold medal bout between the two winners.

 Bouts

 Points

Final round

In the gold medal match, Kozma and Roshchin were equal. The tie-breaker went to Kozma on total points throughout the tournament.

 Bouts

 Points

References

Wrestling at the 1964 Summer Olympics